Acer acuminatum is an Asian species of maple native to the Himalayas and neighboring mountains in Tibet, Kashmir, northern India, Nepal, and Pakistan.

Acer acuminatum is a multi-stemmed tree up to 10 meters tall. It is dioecious, meaning that male and female flowers form on separate plants. Leaves are up to 12 across, each with 3 or 5 lobes. The apexes of its leaves are both caudate and acuminate. Its infructescence ranges from 12 to 20 centimeters long.

References

External links
 

acuminatum
Flora of the Indian subcontinent
Flora of Tibet
Dioecious plants
Plants described in 1825